CD101 or Cd101 may refer to:

 IGSF2, a human gene
 WWCD, an American radio station
 Cadmium-101 (Cd-101 or 101Cd), an isotope of cadmium

See also
 CD101.9, a former jazz station in New York City